About Love. For Adults Only is a 2017 Russian sex comedy film. The film took part in the main competitive program of the film festival Kinotavr 2017.

Plot 
The film takes place in Moscow in the summer. The city lives its own life, something happens here every day. People who are in a hurry for their important affairs, and also do not forget about the acquisition of new knowledge and skills. To do this, each person can take the necessary courses, lectures and trainings on the topic of interest. And the theme of this film is love. Characters  ordinary people, lost in Moscow, each of which has its own love story.

Cast
 Anna Banshchikova as Yelena
 Maksim Matveyev as Nikita Orlov
 Fedor Bondarchuk as Igor
 Aleksandra Bortich as Girl With A Question About Cheating
 Tinatin Dalakishvili as Tanya		
 Ingeborga Dapkūnaitė as Liz
 Anna Mikhalkovaas Vera	
 Lukerya Ilyashenko as Masha
 Viktoriya Isakova as Nina
 Gosha Kutsenko as Aleksei	
 Gleb Kalyuzhnyy as Mitya
 John Malkovich as Ed, The Lecturer
 Aleksandr Pal as Viktor, The DJ
 Ravshana Kurkova as Policewoman
 Yevgeny Tsyganov as Passer
 Yuliya Snigir as Episode
 Mariya Shalayeva as Cafe Owner
 Yuri Kolokolnikov as Episode
 Bi-2 as Cameo
 Keti Topuria as Cameo

References

External links 
 
 HBO купила фильм Анны Меликян «Про Любовь. Только для взрослых»

2017 films
2010s Russian-language films
Films directed by Anna Melikian
Films set in Moscow
Russian anthology films
Russian sex comedy films
2010s sex comedy films
2017 comedy films
Films directed by Natalya Merkulova